Christian Andrés Almeida Rodríguez (born 25 December 1989) is a Uruguayan professional footballer who plays as a left-back for Nacional.

Career
Liverpool were Almeida's first senior team, beginning in his homeland of Uruguay and subsequently remaining for six years with Liverpool. His debut for the club arrived on 13 August 2011 in a draw away to Racing Club (M), which was one of four appearances in the 2011–12 Uruguayan Primera División. Four years and fifty-four appearances later, in March 2015, Almeida scored his first goal in a 2–5 victory over Cerrito; which came in the Uruguayan Segunda División following relegation in 2013–14 - Liverpool won instant promotion back in 2014–15 as champions. He made his Copa Sudamericana bow in 2017 against Fluminense.

In January 2018, Argentine Primera División side Defensa y Justicia signed Almeida. Two goals, against Racing Club (A) and Mitre (cup), in sixteen matches followed in his first season. Almeida departed in January 2019 to join Belgrano. He remained for twelve months as Belgrano suffered relegation to Primera B Nacional. Almeida left in January 2020, as he agreed terms with Godoy Cruz.

In October 2020, Almeida returned to his former club Liverpool. He left the club again at the end of the year. On 9 April 2021, Almeida signed with Nacional.

Career statistics
.

Honours
Liverpool
Segunda División: 2014–15

References

External links

1989 births
Living people
Footballers from Montevideo
Uruguayan footballers
Association football defenders
Uruguayan expatriate footballers
Uruguayan Primera División players
Uruguayan Segunda División players
Argentine Primera División players
Primera Nacional players
Liverpool F.C. (Montevideo) players
Defensa y Justicia footballers
Club Atlético Belgrano footballers
Godoy Cruz Antonio Tomba footballers
Club Nacional de Football players
Expatriate footballers in Argentina
Uruguayan expatriate sportspeople in Argentina